A 3D printing marketplace is a website where users buy, sell and freely share digital 3D printable files for use on 3D printers. They sometimes also offer the ability to print the models and ship them to customers.

Concept 
The market for 3D printers has grown tremendously over the past several years. According to Wohlers Report 2018, 3D printer Market reached 7.3 billions $ in 2017, with +21% growth over the previous year. The market is mostly B2B right now, because 3D printing is still a complex process. But even for SMB or freelance, they cannot develop all the knowledge around this technology, that's why 3D printing marketplace have been developing for last years.

The field of 3D printing is a fascinating field that develops new avenues of creation and engineering. The field is developing rapidly and reaches many industries in the industry as well as mainstream users.

The open source community helps with the effort and makes the 3D creative and learning experience accessible to anyone who wishes, while lowering the barriers for the community worldwide.

Industries and sectors benefiting from the technology are aerospace, medical (dental, maxillofacial, craniofacial, cosmetic surgery, medical equipment, orthopedics, bio-printing), automobile, engineering, tools, architecture, construction, jewelry, fashion, design, food, art, entertainment and education.

How 3D printing marketplaces work 
3D printing marketplaces are a combination of file sharing websites, with or without a built in e-commerce capability.   Designers upload suitable files for 3D printing whilst other users buy or freely download the uploaded files for printing. The marketplaces facilitate the account management, infrastructure, server resources and guarantees safe settlement of payments (e-commerce). Some of the marketplaces also offer additional services such as 3D printing on demand, location of commercial 3D print shops, associated software for model rendering and dynamic viewing of items using packages such as Sketchfab. The most widely used 3D printable file formats as of 2020 are STL, OBJ file, AMF, and 3MF.

Type of 3D printing marketplaces 
There are different varieties of 3D printing marketplaces. Some of them like Thingiverse are dedicated to free sharing of 3D printable files. Others, like Shapeways offer a 3D printing service for objects which have been provided for sale by designers. MyMiniFactory offers a combination of these two: their main activity being the free sharing or 3D printable files, they also offer print-on-demand and design-on-demand services. Another category are websites exemplified by Threeding. These offer free and commercial exchange of digital 3D printable files for use on 3D printers but do not directly include 3D printing services themselves. These marketplaces do however, offer integration to databases of 3D printers provided by third parties. These three resources each contain geo-location services to several thousands of registered 3D printers. The two largest personal 3D printers manufacturers Makerbot (part of  Stratasys) and Cubify (subsidiary of 3D Systems) offer their own file repositories for sharing, respectively Thingiverse and Cubify Store. For professional 3D printing needs there are platforms which offer a reverse-bid style auction interface, an integrated escrow payment system and many features specifically tailored for B2B transactions.

Copyright concerns 
Current intellectual property (IP) legislation in the developed countries does not explicitly regulate 3D printing. This creates numerous questions about the IP status of 3D printing marketplaces. Some analysts predict that 3D printing marketplaces will be "the next Napster". Most marketplaces remain conservative on this topic. Most large 3D printing marketplaces also have procedures for copyright complaints. Further development of 3D printing and more new marketplaces for file sharing will most probably cause copyright to become a significant issue in them.

List of 3D printing marketplaces

See also

References 

Online marketplaces
Marketplace